Santa Ana was a 112-gun three-decker ship of the line of the Spanish Navy, built to plans drawn by engineer Miguel de la Puente, following a specification issued by José Romero Fernández de Landa. Her actual constructor at Ferrol was Honorato Bouyón. She was the prototype and lead ship of the Santa Ana class, also known as los Meregildos, which were built during the following years at Ferrol and Havana and which formed the backbone of the Spanish Navy - the other ships were the Mejicano, Conde de Regla, Salvador del Mundo, Real Carlos, San Hermenegildo, Reina María Luisa and Príncipe de Asturias. Her dimensions were 213.4 Burgos feet (one foot = 0.2786m, so ~ 59m) long, 58 feet (~ 16m) in the beam and a total tonnage of 2,112 tonnes.

History
She was launched on 28 September 1784 at the Reales Astilleros de Esteiro, at Ferrol. She was tested at sea on 28 February 1785 under the captaincy of Félix de Tejada, who reported the test to his commanding officer that the ship "kept the battery in good use [even] in a fresh wind and heavy seas". The success of the trials led to a royal order that subsequent three-deckers would be built to the same plans.

From 1803 to 1804 she was captained by Dionisio Alcalá Galiano. At Trafalgar she was the flagship of Teniente-General Ignacio Maria de Álava y Sáenz de Navarrete and captained by José Ramón de Gardoqui - she suffered 97 killed and 141 wounded, with Alava himself seriously wounded, and was captured by the British. However, two days later, a squadron under the command of Commodores Enrique Macdonell and Cosmao-Kerjulien sallied from Cadiz and succeeded in recapturing her and getting her back to Cadiz.

At the start of the Peninsular War in 1808 she was undergoing repairs at the Arsenal and so could not participate in the capture of the French squadron under Admiral Rosily. She and her sistership Príncipe de Asturias moved to Havana in late 1810 to avoid capture by the French, and sank in its Arsenal in 1816. In 1834 she could still be seen next to the Príncipe de Asturias (which had also sunk) in the mud in front of the Arsenal.

References 

 
 
  
 

1784 ships
Ships built in Spain
Ships of the line of the Spanish Navy
Captured ships